Carlos Smith (1845-1913) was an Argentine military man who served as Chief of the Army General Staff of the Argentine Republic. He took part in various military conflicts, including his active participation against the civil uprisings in the Argentine Revolution of 1893.

He was born in San Martín, Buenos Aires, the son of Francisco Smith and Clara Gabiola, belonging to a family of English and Creole roots.  He was married to Juliana Legesen, born in Entre Ríos, daughter of Bernardo Legesen and Sinforosa de los Santos.

References

External links 
Bautismos 1834-1860
Argentina, National Census, 1895
El general Smith (Caras y Caretas)

1845 births
1940 deaths
Argentine people of English descent
Argentine people of Irish descent
Argentine people of Spanish descent
People from Buenos Aires
Argentine Army officers
Argentine generals